Goodall Park is a baseball venue in Sanford, Maine, United States, which is home to the Sanford Mainers of the New England Collegiate Baseball League.  The park opened in 1915.  It has a seating capacity of 950 spectators.

History

The park opened on May 29, 1915.  Its first game was between the Sanford Professionals and the Lewiston Pilgrims (of Lewiston, Maine).  The game was played in front of 1,300 fans.

In 1919, the park hosted an exhibition game between the Sanford Professionals and the Boston Red Sox.  The game was Babe Ruth's last game in a Red Sox uniform.  Ruth hit a three-run home run to lead the Red Sox to a come-from-behind 4-3 victory.  Ruth did not play in another game for the Red Sox before being traded to the New York Yankees by Red Sox owner Harry Frazee.

1997 fire and rebuilding
In 1997, an arsonist set fire to the park's grandstand and destroyed it.  After debate in Sanford as to whether or not to rebuild the park, the grandstand was rebuilt in 1998 and rededicated on July 16, 1999.  The grandstand was rebuilt at a cost of over $1 million.

Seating areas
Most of the park's 950-spectator capacity comes from the grandstand located directly behind home plate.  The grandstand consists entirely of chairbacked seats.  The park also has a section of metal bleacher seating located down the first base line.

Photo gallery

References

External links
 NECBL website
 Sanford Mainers website
 Goodall Park gallery at digitalballparks.com
 The Hero of Goodall Park: Inside a true-crime drama 50 years in the making

Baseball venues in Maine
Minor league baseball venues
New England Collegiate Baseball League ballparks
Tourist attractions in York County, Maine
Buildings and structures in Sanford, Maine
1915 establishments in Maine
Sports venues completed in 1915